Cylindrocarpon magnusianum is a fungal plant pathogen that causes root rot in alfalfa and red clover.

References

External links 
 Index Fungorum
 USDA ARS Fungal Database

Fungal plant pathogens and diseases
Eudicot diseases
Nectriaceae
Fungi described in 1928